Mac McCutcheon  may refer to:

 Mac McCutcheon (Canadian politician) (1912–1978), Canadian politician and farmer
 Mac McCutcheon (Alabama politician), member of the Alabama House of Representatives